The 2020–21 UC Santa Barbara Gauchos men's basketball team represented the University of California, Santa Barbara in the 2020–21 NCAA Division I men's basketball season. The Gauchos, led by fourth-year head coach Joe Pasternack, play their home games at The Thunderdome in Santa Barbara, California as members of the Big West Conference. They finished the season 22-5, 13-3 in Big West Play to finish as regular season champions. They defeated Long Beach State, UC Davis, and UC Irvine to be champions of the Big West tournament. They received the Big West’s automatic bid to the NCAA tournament where they lost in the first round to Creighton.

Previous season
The Gauchos finished the 2019–20 season 21–10, 10–6 in Big West play to finish in a tie for second place. They were scheduled to play UC Riverside in the quarterfinals of the Big West tournament, however, the tournament was canceled due to the ongoing COVID-19 pandemic.

Roster

Schedule and results 

|-
!colspan=12 style=| Non-conference regular season

|-
!colspan=9 style=| Big West regular season

|-
!colspan=12 style=| Big West tournament
|-

|-
!colspan=12 style=| NCAA tournament
|-

|-

Source

References

UC Santa Barbara Gauchos men's basketball seasons
UC Santa Barbara Gauchos
UC Santa Barbara Gauchos men's basketball
UC Santa Barbara Gauchos men's basketball
UC Santa Barbara